The Old German Owl is a breed of fancy pigeon, and the originator of the short faced German Shield Owls. It was the first breed in Germany to be called Mövchen ("Little Gull") due to its resemblance to the silver gull in color and markings. The breed was again formally recognized in Germany in 1956, but the first official standard was not adopted in Europe until 1960. The standard was adopted by the National Pigeon Association of America in 1999.

Standard 

Origin:
General characteristics:
Element characteristics:
Head: Nearly round, broad, with a well arched forehead and a small full shell crest, closing with rosettes.
Eyes: Large, bright and lively bull eyes. Cere is light and delicate.
Beak: Medium length, broad, light flesh color, making an obtuse angle with the forehead. The wattle is small and undeveloped.
Neck: Short, stocky, held proudly, slanting slightly backwards and upright. The throat has a slight dewlap and a well-developed frill.
Breast: Broad, well rounded and held forward prominently.
Back: Broad in the shoulders, becoming narrower toward the tail, and sloping downward.
Wings: Strong, lying close to the body, covering the back, and resting on the tail.
Tail: Held tightly together, as short as possible.
Legs: Short, shanks are scarcely visible. The feet and toes are never feathered.
Feathers: Well developed, lying tightly against the body.
Current available colors and patterns: Blue, ash red, recessive red, brown, spread, checks, and bars in black, red, brown and white and dilutes of these base colors.. Self white and red.
Colors and markings: All colors are to be as smooth, clear, and saturated as possible. The body color is pure white. The shield marked variety ideally has 10 white flight feathers with colored thumb feathers. The tail marked variety is pure white except for the colored tail feathers which include a wedge-shaped portion of the back and body under the tail.
Undesirable elements:Long body or long feathers; narrow, flat, long or angular head; skimpy, crooked, or too low set crest; missing rosettes; heavy, smudged, uneven bars or checks; long thin beak; coarse or dark eye ceres; missing frill; narrow breast; drooping wings; too upright a station; poor (unsaturated) color; noticeably colored thighs, colored feathers on the head or body; if shield marked, white feathers in shield, uneven, unsymmetrical, incomplete shields, white thumb feathers; if tail marked, white or faulty tail feathers, white plumage under tail area.
Order of rating: Overall impression, body form, head and beak, crest, neck and frill, color and markings.

See also
List of pigeon breeds

External links

Old German Owl Club website
BirdClubsUSA.com
Faircount Pigeon Club
Altdeutsche Mövchen Deutschen Rassetauben-Standard
The Pigeon Cote
Pigeon breeds
Pigeon breeds originating in Germany